Audrey is an English feminine given name. It is the Anglo-Norman form of the Anglo-Saxon name Æðelþryð, composed of the elements æðel "noble" and þryð "strength". The Anglo-Norman form of the name was applied to Saint Audrey (d. 679), also known by the historical form of her name as Saint Æthelthryth. The same name also survived into the modern period in its Anglo-Saxon form, as Etheldred, e.g. Etheldred Benett (1776–1845).

In the 17th century, the name of Saint Audrey gave rise to the adjective tawdry "cheap and pretentious; cheaply adorned". The lace necklaces sold to pilgrims to Saint Audrey fell out of fashion in the 17th century, and so tawdry was reinterpreted as meaning cheap or vulgar. As a consequence, use of the name declined, but it was revived in the 19th century. Popularity of the name in the United States peaked in the interbellum period, but it fell below rank 100 in popularity by 1940 and was not frequently given in the later half of the 20th century; Audrey was the 173rd most common name for females in the United States in the 1990 census. Its popularity has again been on the rise since the 2000s, reaching rank 100 in 2002 and rank 41 in 2012. It was also ranked in the top 100 most common names for girls in France, Belgium, and Canada in the 2000s.

People
 Audrey Marie Anderson (born 1975), American actress and model
 Audrey Assad (born 1983), American contemporary Christian musician
 Audrey Amiss (born 1933), British artist
 Audrey Azoulay (born 1972), French civil servant and politician
 Audrey Barcio (born 1978), American visual artist
 Audrey Brown (1913–2005), British athlete
Audrey Cameron, polymer chemist working at the University of Edinburgh
 Audrey Chapman (1899–1993), American actress
 Audrey De Montigny (born 1985), French-Canadian singer
 Audrey Donnithorne (1922–2020), British missionary and political economist
 Audrey Dufeu-Schubert (born 1980), French politician
Audrey Dwyer, Canadian actor and playwright
 Audrey Emery (1904–1971), American socialite and wife of Grand Duke Dmitri Pavlovich of Russia
Audrey Fagan, Australian police officer
 Audrey Flack (born 1931), American artist
 Audrey Fleurot (born 1977), French actress
Audrey Girouard, Canadian computer scientist and professor
Audrey Gordon, Canadian politician
 Audrey Hepburn (1929–1993), Belgian-born British actress and fashion model
 Audrey Marie Hilley (1933-1987), American murderer
 Audrey Hochberg (1933–2005), New York politician
Audrey Evelyn Jones (1929–2014), British teacher and women's rights campaigner
 Audrey Kitching (born 1985), American model, fashion designer, and fashion blogger
 Audrey Landers (born 1956), American actress
 Audrey Lawson-Johnston (1915–2001), last survivor of the shipwreck Lusitania
Audrey Linkenheld (born 1973), French politician
 Audrey Long (1922–2014), American actress
 Audrey Luna, American operatic soprano
 Audrey Malte, a name used to refer to Ethelreda Malte (died 1559), alleged illegitimate daughter of Henry VIII
 Audrey McLaughlin (born 1936), Canadian politician, former leader of the New Democratic Party
 Audrey Meadows (1922–1996), American actress
 Audrey Meaney (born 1931), British archaeologist
 Audrey Mestre (1974–2002), French athlete
 Audrey Morris (1928–2018), American jazz singer
 Audrey Munson (1891–1996), American model and actress
 Audrey Niffenegger (born 1963), American novelist
 Audrey Ong Pei Ling (born 1980), Singaporean criminal and accomplice of British convicted killer Michael McCrea
 Audrey Osborne, Duchess of Leeds, British aristocrat
 Audrey Patterson (1926–1996), American athlete
 Audrey Penn (born 1947), American author
 Audrey Richards (1899–1984), British anthropologist
 Audrey Riley, cellist and string arranger based in the UK
 Audrey Stuckes (1923–2006), British material scientist
 Audrey Tang (born 1981), Taiwanese software programmer
 Audrey Tautou (born 1976), French actress
 Audrey Terras (born 1942), American mathematician
 Audrey Totter (1918–2013), American actress
 Audrey Wasilewski (born 1967), American voice actress
 Audrey Wells (1960–2018), American film director and screenwriter
 Audrey Williamson (1926–2010), British athlete
Audrey Whitby, American actress

Fictional characters 
 Audrey Anderson, in the 2010 film Legion
 Audrey Belrose, a dateable character in the dating simulation video game Huniepop
Audrey Bourgeois, in the animated series Miraculous: Tales of Ladybug and Cat Noir
Audrey fforbes-Hamilton, in the BBC television sitcom To the Manor Born
 Audrey Fulquard, heroine of The Little Shop of Horrors, and her namesake "Audrey Jr." or "Audrey II"
 Audrey Gordon, played by Heidi Areana in the satirical Australian television cooking series Audrey's Kitchen
 Audrey Hanson, in the television series Heroes
 Audrey Hope, on the 2021 Gossip Girl TV series
 Audrey Horne, on the television series Twin Peaks
 Audrey Parker-Nichols, in the Nickelodeon sitcom Drake & Josh
 Audrey Raines, in television series 24
 Audrey Reede, in the film Liar Liar
 Audrey Roberts, on the British soap opera Coronation Street
 Audrey Rose, from the novel, Audrey Rose, and its adaptations 
 Audrey Safranek, in the film, Downsizing
 Audrey Turfe, in Ben Jonson's A Tale of a Tub
 Audrey, in the eponymous 1902 novel by Mary Johnston, and its 1916 silent film adaptation
 Audrey, in Shakespeare's As You Like It
 Little Audrey, a cartoon character who was mainly popular during the 1950s and 1960s
Audrey Sharma, in the 2012 Disney Channel film Radio Rebel
 Audrey Smith Bertha, on Harvey Girls Forever!

See also 
 Aubrey (name)
 Audre Lorde (1934–1992), Caribbean-American writer
 Audre Trupin, birth name of Pinny Cooke (1923–2004), New York politician
 Æthelred
 Aldred

Notes

Given names
Feminine given names
English feminine given names
French feminine given names